Class 21 may refer to:
 Belgian Railways Class 21, Belgian electric locomotive
 British Rail Class 21 (NBL), British diesel-electric locomotive
 British Rail Class 21 (MaK), various locomotives used by Eurotunnel
 L&YR Class 21, British 0-4-0ST steam locomotive
 NSB Class 21, Norwegian 2-6-0 steam locomotive
 South African Class 21 2-10-4, South African steam locomotive